Thomas Heurtaux (born 3 July 1988) is a French professional footballer who currently plays for Pohronie in the Fortuna Liga. 

He previously played domestically for Caen and Cherbourg, for Italian clubs Udinese and Hellas Verona, and for Ankaragücü of the Turkish Süper Lig.

Club career

Caen
The Normandy native came through the ranks at Caen, and spent his entire career with the club, apart from a loan spell at Cherbourg in 2008-09, when he scored two goals in 25 appearances.

Heurtaux represented the club 65 times, scoring five goals in the process, to establish himself in the Caen first team.

Udinese
On 25 May 2012, Udinese confirmed the signing of Heurtaux from Caen on a two-year deal.

Loan to Hellas Verona
On 12 July 2017, he agreed to join Hellas Verona for a year loan.

Ankaragücü
On 18 August 2018, he joined Turkish club Ankaragücü on a permanent transfer. A year later, having claimed that the club had not paid his wages for nine months, Heurtaux cancelled his contract.

Salernitana
He returned to Italian football with Serie B club Salernitana on 2 September 2019.

Pohronie
In the winter of 2021, Heurtaux signed with Pohronie for half-season, with an aim to save the team from relegation in the  Fortuna Liga. The club remained in the top division and Heurtaux appeared in 16 games.

References
Infobox stats
 
General

External links
 News about the transfer

1988 births
Living people
People from Lisieux
Sportspeople from Calvados (department)
French footballers
French expatriate footballers
Association football defenders
Stade Malherbe Caen players
AS Cherbourg Football players
Udinese Calcio players
Hellas Verona F.C. players
MKE Ankaragücü footballers
U.S. Salernitana 1919 players
FK Pohronie players
Ligue 1 players
Ligue 2 players
Serie A players
Serie B players
Süper Lig players
Slovak Super Liga players
Expatriate footballers in Italy
French expatriate sportspeople in Italy
Expatriate footballers in Turkey
French expatriate sportspeople in Turkey
Expatriate footballers in Slovakia
French expatriate sportspeople in Slovakia
Footballers from Normandy